Omaha is a city in Morris County, northeast Texas, United States. The population at the 2010 U.S. Census was 1,024.

History

This area of Texas had been lightly settled under Spanish and Mexican rule. It was primarily settled after annexation by the United States by migrants from the South, many of whom arrived before the American Civil War. In that period, farmers had established cotton plantations. It was also an area of pine forests.

Omaha was first named as Morristown in 1880 by former Confederate Lieutenant Thompson Morris; it was stop on the new St. Louis Southwestern Railway, which spurred the town's development as a trading center. The US Post Office had changed the name to Gavett. In 1886, a group of seven men from Randolph County, Alabama drew names from a hat to pick a new name; the winner, Hugh Ellis, was allowed to rename the settlement after a town in his home state, and he chose Omaha.

"By 1890 Omaha had three churches, a school, a weekly newspaper, and a population of 450." The town was incorporated in 1914. A new enterprise of raising vegetable-plant seedlings for sale developed in the area. During the twentieth century, Omaha was the site of a shipping operation that sent millions of these seedlings to destinations throughout the United States. "In 1980 it had a population of 960 and twenty-three rated businesses", reaching nearly 1,000 by the end of the 20th century.

Geography

Omaha is located at  (33.1816, –94.7422).

Demographics

As of the 2020 United States census, there were 936 people, 461 households, and 256 families residing in the city.

Education

The City of Omaha is served by the Pewitt Consolidated Independent School District.

Notable people

 Randolph E. (Randy) Moore, a native of Omaha, played in the Texas League and the National League in the 1920s and 1930s. He was inducted into the Texas Baseball Hall of Fame in Arlington

References

Further reading

Jean Connor, A Short History of Morris County (Daingerfield, Texas: Daingerfield Bicentennial Commission, 1975).

Cities in Texas
Cities in Morris County, Texas